The 1965 Campeonato Profesional was the 18th season of Colombia's top-flight football league. 13 teams competed against one another. Deportivo Cali won their first league title in history, cutting a streak of four straight championships won by Millonarios.

Background and league system
The same 13 teams from the last tournament competed in this one. The tournament was once again played under a round-robin format, with every team playing each other four times (twice at home and twice away) for a total of 48 matches. Teams received two points for a win and one point for a draw. If two or more teams were tied on points, places were determined by goal difference. The team with the most points became the champion of the league. 312 matches were played during the season, with a total of 992 goals scored. Deportivo Cali won the championship for the first time, the runners-up were Atlético Nacional. Santa Fe scored the highest number of goals, with 99 goals scored, Cúcuta Deportivo conceded the most goals with 102 goals against. Argentine player Perfecto Rodríguez, who played for Independiente Medellín, was the season's top goalscorer with 38 goals.

Teams

Final standings

Results

First turn

Second turn

Top goalscorers

Source: RSSSF.com Colombia 1965

References

External links 
Dimayor Official Page

1965 in Colombian football
Colombia
Categoría Primera A seasons